Anas railway station is a railway station in Dahod district of Gujarat State of India. It is under Ratlam railway division of Western Railway Zone of Indian Railways. It is located on New Delhi–Mumbai main line of the Indian Railways. Passenger, MEMU and Express trains halt here.

Major trains

The following trains halt at Anas railway station in both direction:

 19019/20 Bandra Terminus - Dehradun Express

References

Railway stations in Dahod district
Ratlam railway division